Stanley L. Weinberg (August 21, 1911 – March 28, 2001) was the founder of the National Center for Science Education.

External links
 Stanley Weinberg, NCSE Founder, Dies by Eugenie C. Scott, Executive Director of NCSE.

1911 births
2001 deaths